Miss New Zealand International is New Zealand's representative for the Miss International beauty pageant. Miss International is one of the four Grand Slam pageants in the world, the other three being Miss Universe, Miss World and Miss Earth.
The Miss New Zealand International franchise is currently owned by the New Zealand Asia Pacific Trust with Meghan Kenney as the National Director (she is also the ND of the entire Miss New Zealand pageant and their other titles). Previously, the title was awarded to the first runner up of the Miss World New Zealand pageant until 2017 where it was awarded to the second runner up, Michelle Isemonger. It is now the lead title of the Miss New Zealand pageant after the Miss World franchise was dropped.

Titleholders

References

External links 
 https://web.archive.org/web/20081023023052/http://www.miss-international.org/
https://web.archive.org/web/20191221183018/https://www.missworld.co.nz/

Beauty pageants in New Zealand
New Zealand awards